Eric Ebert (born August 27, 1984) is an American soccer player who last played for Chivas USA.  He is the son of Don Ebert, who played professional soccer for the New York Cosmos (NASL), St. Louis Steamers (MISL) and Los Angeles Lazers (MISL), and was the captain of the 1980 U.S. Olympic team.

Ebert was a three-time All-Sea View selection, a two-time all-CIF pick, and was named Irvine World News "Athlete of the Year" in 2003 while playing for Woodbridge High School in Irvine, California, prior to attending the University of California, Berkeley. Ebert appeared in over 70 games for the Golden Bears, earning all-Pac-10 honors multiple years. During his college years Ebert also played for Orange County Blue Star in the USL Premier Development League.

Ebert was the last draft pick - 52nd overall - of the 2007 MLS SuperDraft, by Houston Dynamo, but never appeared for Dynamo's first team. He was transferred to CD Chivas USA prior to the beginning of the 2008 season, and made his MLS debut in Chivas's home opener against Real Salt Lake on 5 April 2008.

External links
 Cal Player Profile
 Chivas USA Player Profile

1984 births
Living people
Soccer players from California
Sportspeople from Irvine, California
American soccer players
California Golden Bears men's soccer players
Orange County Blue Star players
Houston Dynamo FC players
Chivas USA players
USL League Two players
Major League Soccer players
Houston Dynamo FC draft picks
Association football midfielders